The 2009 Makhachkala Il-76 collision occurred on 15 January 2009 near 18:00 UTC, when two Ilyushin Il-76 transport aircraft of the Russian Ministry of Internal Affairs (MVD) collided at Uytash Airport serving the city of Makhachkala in Dagestan, Russia.

Description
One of the aircraft was landing in freezing fog with 31 crew and passengers on board, while the other, having disembarked all of its passengers, was taxiing for take-off. The taxiing Il-76 crossed the taxiway end-line but did not report its position to air traffic control (ATC). ATC gave permission to the approaching Il-76 to land. Due to a sudden gust of wind, the landing aircraft deviated to the right and struck the taxiing Il-76's cockpit with its wing. Both aircraft then caught fire. The airport was closed until the following morning.

Four crew members were killed in the taxiing aircraft. There were no fatalities among the occupants of the landing aircraft. 2 passengers on board the taxiing Il-76 survived with major injuries.

References

External links

2009 disasters in Russia
Aviation accidents and incidents in 2009
Accidents and incidents involving the Ilyushin Il-76
January 2009 events in Russia
Aviation accidents and incidents in Russia
Makhachkala
Airliner accidents and incidents involving ground collisions